The Pilgrims in The Canterbury Tales by Geoffrey Chaucer are the main characters in the framing narrative of the book.

In addition, they can be considered as characters of the framing narrative the Host, who travels with the pilgrims, the Canon, and the fictive Geoffrey Chaucer, the teller of the tale of Sir Thopas (who might be considered distinct from the Chaucerian narrator, who is in turn somewhat divorced from Chaucer the author).

Groupings
The pilgrims fall into various groups, the religious group and the military group for example.

Also there are important pairs, including the tale pairs - which pair are supposed to be telling their tales on the same night.

Pilgrims and other travelers

References

The Canterbury Tales
Canterbury Tales